Yakassé-Mé  is a town in southeastern Ivory Coast. It is a sub-prefecture of Adzopé Department in La Mé Region, Lagunes District.

Yakassé-Mé was a commune until March 2012, when it became one of 1,126 communes that were abolished.

References

Sub-prefectures of La Mé
Former communes of Ivory Coast